National Route 26 is a national highway in South Korea connects Gunsan to Seo District, Daegu. It established on 31 August 1971.

Main stopovers
North Jeolla Province
 Gunsan - Iksan - Gimje - Jeonju - Wanju County - Jinan County - Jangsu County
South Gyeongsang Province
 Hamyang County - Geochang County - Hapcheon County
North Gyeongsang Province
 Goryeong County
Daegu
 Dalseong County - Dalseo District - Nam District - Dalseo District - Seo District

Major intersections

 (■): Motorway
IS: Intersection, IC: Interchange

North Jeolla Province

South Gyeongsang Province

North Gyeongsang Province

Daegu

References

26
Roads in North Jeolla
Roads in South Gyeongsang
Roads in North Gyeongsang
Roads in Daegu